Automatika is a robotics and automation firm based in  O'Hara Township, Pennsylvania, United States, North America.

History
Automatika was started by two Carnegie Mellon University graduates in 1995.

In April 2007, the company was acquired by QinetiQ North America, which has remained its current owner.

Products
Automatika builds robots for defense, energy, and hazardous activity support. Automatika makes an urban combat and defense robot called the Dragon Runner.

See also 
 Military robot

References

External links 
 QinetiQ North America Website
 Legacy Automatika Website

Robotics companies of the United States
Technology companies established in 1995
1995 establishments in Pennsylvania
Companies based in Allegheny County, Pennsylvania
Qinetiq
2007 mergers and acquisitions
American subsidiaries of foreign companies